SSDC may refer to:

 SSDC, Inc., a games publisher based in New York state
 Society of Stage Directors and Choreographers, former name of SDC, a national labor union in the theatrical entertainment industry
 South Somerset District Council
 Single steel drilling caisson